The Panic Broadcast is the eighth studio album by Swedish melodic death metal band Soilwork, released July 2 in Europe and July 13 in North America, 2010. The album marks the return of long-time Soilwork guitarist and founder Peter Wichers, who also picks up the role as the album's producer, though Wichers would leave Soilwork again in 2012. The album also features the debut of guitarist Sylvain Coudret who replaced longtime guitarist Ola Frenning in 2008.  Mixing was done by Jens Bogren.
According to Nielsen SoundScan, The Panic Broadcast sold around 5,257 copies in its first week of sales in the United States. The album debuted at #88 on the Billboard 200 chart, making it their highest-charting album in their entire career at the time.

Album
Musically, this album found the band moving back more to their speed-laden, melodic death metal roots, though the already present alternative and metalcore sound still remains.  In an interview with SuicideGirls.com, Wichers spoke about what direction the band might take musically with its next album. "We talked about maybe taking a little bit of a different approach for the next record," he said. "Having me and Sylvain back in the band, I think that we're probably going to try to do stuff that might be a little more technical. We want to keep the element of the catchy chorus but at the same time maybe have bit more guitar solos than on Sworn to a Great Divide and also let Dirk [Verbeuren, drums] get more space on the record for drumming. That was one of the things I think that 'Sworn to a Great Divide' was lacking a little bit. It's a good record but I think that with such talented musicians the next album definitely needs to have more performance." Peter Wichers also stated that this album will have more blues elements that previous albums and even said that one of the riffs for 'The Thrill' was inspired by a bluegrass riff.

Lead vocalist Björn Strid confirmed 18 February 2010 that the drums for the album had already been recorded. He also confirmed the names of six tracks: "The Thrill", "Late for the Kill, Early for the Slaughter", "The Akuma Afterglow", "Let This River Flow", "Where Angels Fear to Tread" and "Two Lives Worth of Reckoning". The complete track listing was revealed on April 8.

On 17 May 2010, the band released "Two Lives Worth of Reckoning" on their MySpace.

Track listing

Personnel
Soilwork
Björn "Speed" Strid – vocals
Peter Wichers – lead guitar
Ola Flink – bass
Sven Karlsson – keyboards
Dirk Verbeuren – drums
Sylvain Coudret – rhythm guitar

Technical personnel
Peter Wichers – production, engineering
Jens Bogren - mixing

Reception

The NewReview gave the album a 4.0 out of 5 and stated "Soilwork is the kind of band so ahead of the curve they have the keys to the asphalt paving machine. The Panic Broadcast is another in a long line of Soilwork albums crammed full of metal goodness and makes you sorry you fell for cheap, trendy trash."

Charts

References

Soilwork albums
2010 albums
Nuclear Blast albums